Woman in the Dark may refer to:

Woman in the Dark (1933 novella), crime story by Dashiell Hammett
Woman in the Dark (1934 film), American crime drama directed by Phil Rosen
Woman in the Dark (1952 film), American crime drama directed by George Blair